Louisburg is an unincorporated community in Grant County, Wisconsin, within the town of Jamestown. The zipcode is 53807. Louisburg Creek flows through the area.

Louisburg is located 1.5 miles east of Kieler, 2.5 miles southeast of Dickeyville, 8 miles west of Cuba City and 10 miles northeast of Dubuque, Iowa. There are approximately 30 residences and 7 rental properties in Louisburg which are home to an estimated 110 people.

Notable people
Thomas B. Larkin, United States Army officer

Notes

Unincorporated communities in Grant County, Wisconsin
Unincorporated communities in Wisconsin